Tomáš Čatár (born 19 January 1977) is a Slovak former professional tennis player.

Biography
Čatár, who grew up in Bratislava, was a junior semi-finalist at the 1995 French Open. 

On the professional circuit he reached a career high singles ranking of 239 in the world and made his only ATP Tour main draw appearances at the 1998 Croatia Open Umag, as a qualifier. He twice featured in the qualifying draw for the Australian Open.

In 1999 he competed for Slovakia at the World Team Cup in Düsseldorf, alongside Karol Kučera and Dominik Hrbatý. He played in two doubles matches, both partnering Hrbaty, against France and the United States. They won the match against France, who were represented by Nicolas Escudé and Guillaume Raoux.

A graduate of Auburn University, Čatár is now based in Alabama and works as a tennis coach.

References

External links
 
 

1977 births
Living people
Slovak male tennis players
Tennis players from Bratislava
Auburn University alumni
Slovak expatriate sportspeople in the United States